The 1963 British Grand Prix was a Formula One motor race held at the Silverstone Circuit in Northamptonshire, England on 20 July 1963. It was race 5 of 10 in both the 1963 World Championship of Drivers and the 1963 International Cup for Formula One Manufacturers. It was also the eighteenth British Grand Prix, and the first to be held at Silverstone since 1960. The race was won by Scotsman Jim Clark for the second year in succession driving a Lotus 25.

Classification

Qualifying

Race

Championship standings after the race

Drivers' Championship standings

Constructors' Championship standings

 Notes: Only the top five positions are included for both sets of standings.

References

British Grand Prix
British Grand Prix
Grand Prix